Streptomyces lateritius is a bacterium species from the genus of Streptomyces which has been isolated from soil. Streptomyces lateritius produces the naphthoquinone antibiotic granatomycin D.

See also 
 List of Streptomyces species

References

Further reading

External links
Type strain of Streptomyces lateritius at BacDive -  the Bacterial Diversity Metadatabase

lateritius
Bacteria described in 1958